Ahmed Malallah (Arabic:أحمد مال الله) (born 9 November 1991) is an Emirati footballer who plays for Hatta as a forward, most recently for Al Urooba.

International career

International goals
Scores and results list the United Arab Emirates' goal tally first.

External links

References

Emirati footballers
1991 births
Living people
Baniyas Club players
Al-Ittihad Kalba SC players
Al Jazira Club players
Ajman Club players
Dibba FC players
Emirates Club players
Hatta Club players
Al Urooba Club players
Place of birth missing (living people)
UAE First Division League players
UAE Pro League players
Association football forwards
United Arab Emirates international footballers